Cevher Toktaş (born 13 September 1987) is a Turkish footballer who last played as a centre-back for Bursa Yıldırımspor in the Turkish Regional Amateur League. In May 2020, Toktaş admitted to murdering his five-year-old son by suffocating him with a pillow while in the hospital.

Career
Toktaş made his professional debut for Gençlerbirliği OFTAŞ in the Süper Lig on 2 March 2008, coming on as a substitute in the 89th minute for Serkan Atak in the away match against Çaykur Rizespor, which finished as a 0–0 draw. In total, he made seven appearances for Gençlerbirliği OFTAŞ/Hacettepe in the Süper Lig.

Murder of son
On 23 April 2020, Toktaş's son Kasım, aged five, was brought to Dortcelik Children's Hospital in Bursa with a high fever, breathing difficulties, and coughing. This was thought to be caused by COVID-19. Later that day, Kasım died while in the ICU, which was believed to have been caused by the disease. However, Toktaş went to the police eleven days later on 4 May to confess he had murdered his son while alone in the hospital room. Toktaş admitted to suffocating his son with a pillow over the head for fifteen minutes until he died, before calling a doctor into the room. Toktaş, who said he did not disclose the crime with his family, was subsequently arrested while awaiting trial. In the police report, he stated that he had never loved his son, but that he had no mental issues. He later confessed after feeling remorse. In 2022, Toktaş received an aggravated life sentence.

Notes

References

External links
 
 

1987 births
Living people
Sportspeople from Malatya
Turkish footballers
Association football central defenders
Bursaspor footballers
Hacettepe S.K. footballers
Kahramanmaraşspor footballers
Tarsus Idman Yurdu footballers
Siirtspor footballers
Adıyamanspor footballers
Süper Lig players
TFF First League players
TFF Second League players
TFF Third League players
Turkish murderers of children
Male murderers
Sportspeople convicted of murder

People convicted of murder by Turkey
Prisoners sentenced to life imprisonment by Turkey